Santa Cruz Valley National Heritage Area is a federally designated National Heritage Area in south Arizona. The national heritage area covers 3,300 square miles of the watershed of the Santa Cruz River to protect and honor the areas natural environment, culture, and historic sites. It includes land in both Pima County and Santa Cruz County.

Plans for a National Heritage Area in the Santa Cruz watershed began in the early 2000s, and were first introduced to state legislature in 2007. The area was made official in 2019 after the passing of the John D. Dingell Jr. Conservation, Management, and Recreation Act. Santa Cruz Valley Heritage Alliance, Inc. is the non-profit entity that manages the programs and projects of the Santa Cruz Valley National Heritage Area.

References

External links
 Santa Cruz Valley National Heritage Area official website

National Heritage Areas of the United States
2019 establishments in Arizona
Protected areas established in 2019
Protected areas of Pima County, Arizona
Protected areas of Santa Cruz County, Arizona